The 4th Renfrewshire Rifle Volunteers Football Club was a 19th-century association football club based in Pollokshaws, now part of Glasgow.

History

The club was formed  out of the 4th Renfrewshire Rifle Volunteers, a company in the Volunteer movement of the British Army.  The Volunteers included sporting activities within their purview and newspapers often carried reports of such activities.  The growth of football in Scotland, especially thanks to Queen's Park F.C., and the success of army teams in England such as the Royal Engineers A.F.C., encouraged regiments to form football clubs as part of the physical regimen.  

The 4th R.R.V. was formed in 1874, in the vanguard of other Volunteer regimental sides.  It was playing matches against external sides at least by the 1875–76 season, by which time it was running two XIs.

The club entered the Scottish Cup for the first time in 1876–77.  The club was drawn to play West End F.C. in Cowlairs and lost to two first-half goals, "play on both sides being very fast and good".

The Volunteers entered a second time in 1877–78, losing 1–0 to Telegraphists F.C. in the first round. 

The club entered in the following two years, but scratched before its first round ties, and the entry to the Cup in 1879–80 is the final record for the club.

Colours

The club wore blue shirts and white shorts.

Grounds

The club played on the Renfrew Road until 1877, and Shawholm Park afterwards.

References

Defunct football clubs in Scotland
Football clubs in Glasgow
Association football clubs established in 1874
Association football clubs disestablished in 1879
1874 establishments in Scotland
1879 disestablishments in Scotland 
Military football clubs in Scotland